Teresa Checks In is an American reality television series which premiered on the Bravo cable network, on October 11, 2015. The three-part television special chronicles the life of the Giudice family and how its members dealt with the aftermath of Teresa Giudice's being sentenced to prison. Teresa is known for having appeared on The Real Housewives of New Jersey since its premiere, in 2009, and on Celebrity Apprentice 5 (2012), and for writing a series of bestselling books.

The series is the second spin-off of The Real Housewives of New Jersey, following Manzo'd with Children.

Episodes

References

External links
 

2010s American reality television series
2015 American television series debuts
2015 American television series endings
American television spin-offs
English-language television shows
Television shows set in New Jersey
Bravo (American TV network) original programming
The Real Housewives spin-offs
Reality television spin-offs